Alexander Ilyin ((born January 11, 1973) is a Russian mathematician, Professor, Dr. Sc., a professor at the Faculty of Computer Science at the Moscow State University, Corresponding Member of the Russian Academy of Sciences. Expert in robust control theory.

He defended the thesis «Robust inversion of dynamic systems» for the degree of Doctor of Physical and Mathematical Sciences (2009).

He has authored four books and more than 90 scientific articles.

He is the son of famed mathematician Vladimir Ilyin.

References

Bibliography

External links
 Russian Academy of Sciences
 RAS Archive
 MSU CMC
 Scientific works of Alexander Ilyin
 Scientific works of Alexander Ilyin

Living people
1973 births
Russian computer scientists
Mathematicians from Moscow
Moscow State University alumni
Academic staff of Moscow State University
Corresponding Members of the Russian Academy of Sciences